Toodyay Fire Station is on Stirling Terrace in Toodyay, Western Australia.

Architectural style

Toodyay Fire Station was designed by architect Ken Duncan, a member of the Volunteer Fire Brigade, and was built in 1939.  It is notable for its Art Deco facade. It is one of two single bay Stripped Classical fire stations built during the Western Australian Fire Brigades Board's 1930s building campaign. It is rendered in part and bricked to lower level, all painted. An extension to the side is in the same style.

History

Toodyay Fire Station was a result of the Bush Fires Act 1937, which permitted local authorities to take over the responsibility of bushfire control, along with purchase and storage of fire-fighting equipment and setting up of fire-fighting brigades.

The fire station services were relocated to a new building in 2002.

The Toodyay Fire Station is now used as an art gallery.

References 

Fire stations completed in 1939
Buildings and structures in Toodyay, Western Australia
Contemporary art galleries in Australia
Defunct fire stations in Western Australia
Stirling Terrace, Toodyay
State Register of Heritage Places in the Shire of Toodyay